Björn Emmerling (born 16 November 1975 in Würzburg) is a field hockey player from Germany, who played for Harvestehuder THC and Hanauer THC in his native country. The defender made his international senior debut for the German team in 1996, and competed at three Summer Olympics. He retired from international play after the 11th World Cup, in Germany in September 2006 with 256 caps and 58 goals. In 2007, he received the town of Mönchengladbach "Sportler des Jahres" (Sportsman of the Year) award.

International Senior Tournaments
 1996 – Summer Olympics, Atlanta (4th place)
 1998 – Champions Trophy, Lahore (6th place)
 1999 – European Indoor Nations Cup, Slagelse (1st place)
 1999 – European Nations Cup, Padova (1st place)
 2000 – Champions Trophy, Amstelveen (2nd place)
 2000 – Summer Olympics, Sydney (5th place)
 2001 – European Indoor Nations Cup, Luzern (1st place)
 2001 – Champions Trophy, Rotterdam (1st place)
 2002 – World Cup, Kuala Lumpur (1st place)
 2002 – Champions Trophy, Cologne (2nd place)
 2003 – European Indoor Nations Cup, Santander (1st place)
 2003 – World Cup Indoor, Leipzig (1st place)
 2003 – 2003 Men's Hockey European Nations Cup|European Nations Cup, Barcelona (1st place)
 2004 – Summer Olympics, Athens (3rd place)
 2005 – World Games, Duisburg (1st place)
 2005 – 2005 Men's Hockey European Nations Cup|European Nations Cup, Leipzig (3rd place)
 2006 – 11th World Cup, Mönchengladbach (1st place)

References

External links
 

1975 births
Living people
German male field hockey players
Male field hockey midfielders
Field hockey players at the 1996 Summer Olympics
Field hockey players at the 2000 Summer Olympics
2002 Men's Hockey World Cup players
Field hockey players at the 2004 Summer Olympics
2006 Men's Hockey World Cup players
Olympic field hockey players of Germany
Olympic bronze medalists for Germany
Olympic medalists in field hockey
Medalists at the 2004 Summer Olympics
Harvestehuder THC players
Sportspeople from Würzburg